Vicky Batra is an Indian television actor. He appeared in one episode of Sony TV's Adaalat and played the role of Sujamal in Zee TV's series Jodha Akbar.

Television
2016
|-Fearfiles
|. Rahul

References

External links

Living people
Indian male film actors
Indian male television actors
Year of birth missing (living people)